Oliver Lafayette (born May 6, 1984) is an American-born Croatian former professional basketball player.

High school and college career
Lafayette attended Capitol High School in Baton Rouge, Louisiana and led the basketball team to a 29–3 record his senior year. Lafayette attended first Blinn College and Brown Mackie College before transferring to the University of Houston. At Houston during his junior year, Lafayette started 30 of 31 games and earned 2nd team all Conference USA while finishing third in scoring in C-USA with a 15.7 points per game average. During his senior year in 2006–07, Lafayette averaged 14.3 points, 5.9 rebounds and 3.1 assists per game. He also majored in sociology.

Professional career

Lafayette played with the Fort Wayne Mad Ants during the 2009–10 season in the NBA Development League. With the Mad Ants, the guard started 42 of 48 games and averaged 17.1 points, 6.5 assists and 1.8 steals in 35.3 minutes per game. On April 14, 2010, Lafayette signed with the Boston Celtics of the National Basketball Association and appeared in one game with the team in which he scored 7 points. According to research by STATS LLC, those 7 points are an NBA record for most points scored in a career of exactly one game played.  Upon playing with the Celtics, Lafayette became the 23rd former Houston Cougar to play in the NBA.

On October 13, 2010, Lafayette signed with Partizan Belgrade in Serbia, but the contract was terminated in November.

In December 2010, Lafayette practiced with the Fort Wayne Mad Ants, his former team. He was going to sign with the Mad Ants once he was officially released from Partizan Belgrade. After averaging 16.4 points per game with the Mad Ants, he signed a four-month contract with the Turkish team Beşiktaş. But due to health problems, his contract was dropped.

In February 2011, Lafayette signed with Maccabi Ashdod in Israel. On October 5, 2011 he signed a one-year contract with Asseco Prokom Gdynia in Poland.

In January 2012, Lafayette signed with Anadolu Efes Istanbul for the remainder of the 2011–12 season. Later that year, he joined Žalgiris Kaunas. He signed with Valencia Basket in the offseason in 2013.

On June 22, 2014, he signed a two-year deal with Olympiacos Piraeus. On June 29, 2015, he parted ways with Olympiacos.

On July 9, 2015, he signed with the Italian club Emporio Armani Milano.

On July 18, 2016, Lafayette signed with Spanish team Unicaja. In April 2017, Lafayette won his second EuroCup with Unicaja after beating Valencia BC in the Finals.

On July 31, 2017, Lafayette signed with Italian club Virtus Bologna.

On November 13, 2018, Lafayette signed with Bosnian club Igokea.

International career
The Croatian Basketball Federation asked for permission to give Oliver Lafayette a Croatian citizenship for sports interest, which the Croatian Olympic Committee approved. Lafayette was awarded with a Croatian passport and represented Croatia at the 2014 FIBA Basketball World Cup.

Overseas Elite
In the summer of 2017, Lafayette joined two-time The Basketball Tournament defending champion Overseas Elite. On August 3, 2017, Blair's team, Overseas Elite won its third straight The Basketball Tournament championship with an 86-83 victory over Team Challenge ALS on ESPN.

Career statistics

NBA

Regular season

|-
| align="left" | 
| align="left" | Boston
| 1 || 0 || 22.0 || .500 || .500 || .000 || 4.0 || 2.0 || .0 || .0 || 7.0
|- class="sortbottom"
| style="text-align:left;"| Career
| style="text-align:left;"|
| 1 || 0 || 22.0 || .500 || .500 || .000 || 4.0 || 2.0 || .0 || .0 || 7.0

Euroleague

|-
| style="text-align:left;"| 2010–11
| style="text-align:left;"| Partizan Belgrade
| 6 || 3 || 25.8 || .221 || .154 || .654 || 3.7 || 3.3 || 1.3 || .0 || 8.5 || 6.3
|-
| style="text-align:left;"| 2011–12
| style="text-align:left;"| Asseco Prokom
| 10 || 0 || 24.5 || .411 || .381 || .708 || 2.5 || 3.3 || 1.4 || .0 || 10.7 || 11.0
|-
| style="text-align:left;"| 2011–12
| style="text-align:left;"| Anadolu Efes
| 6 || 2 || 23.0 || .419 || .313 || .917 || 3.2 || 2.8 || 1.5 || .0 || 8.7 || 11.7
|-
| style="text-align:left;"| 2012–13
| style="text-align:left;"| Zalgiris
| 23 || 11 || 21.2 || .361 || .323 || .900 || 2.1 || 2.8 || .9 || .0 || 7.9 || 7.3
|-
| style="text-align:left;"| 2014–15
| style="text-align:left;"| Olympiacos
| 29 || 1 || 18.3 || .386 || .404 || .606 || 2.1 || 2.6 || .5 || .0 || 6.8 || 6.9
|-
| style="text-align:left;"| 2015–16
| style="text-align:left;"| Milano
| 10 || 3 || 22.5 || .435 || .259 || .846 || 2.0 || 2.1 || 1 || .2 || 7.3 || 5.4
|- class="sortbottom"
| style="text-align:left;"| Career
| style="text-align:left;"|
| 74 || 17 || 21.1 || .364 || .346 || .736 || 2.4 || 2.8 || .9 || .0 || 7.9 || 8.0

Domestic leagues

See also 
 List of foreign basketball players in Serbia

References

External links

 
 Oliver Lafayette at eurobasket.com
 Oliver Lafayette at euroleague.net
 Oliver Lafayette at fiba.com
 Oliver Lafayette at uhcougars.com

1984 births
Living people
2014 FIBA Basketball World Cup players
African-American basketball players
American expatriate basketball people in Bosnia and Herzegovina
American expatriate basketball people in Greece
American expatriate basketball people in Israel
American expatriate basketball people in Italy
American expatriate basketball people in Lithuania
American expatriate basketball people in Mexico
American expatriate basketball people in Poland
American expatriate basketball people in Serbia
American expatriate basketball people in Spain
American expatriate basketball people in Turkey
American men's basketball players
Anadolu Efes S.K. players
Articles containing video clips
Asseco Gdynia players
Baloncesto Málaga players
Basketball players from Baton Rouge, Louisiana
BC Žalgiris players
Blinn Buccaneers men's basketball players
Boston Celtics players
Correcaminos UAT Victoria players
Croatian expatriate basketball people in Serbia
Croatian expatriate basketball people in Spain
Croatian expatriate basketball people in Turkey
Croatian men's basketball players
Croatian people of African-American descent
Erie BayHawks (2008–2017) players
Fort Wayne Mad Ants players
Houston Cougars men's basketball players
Junior college men's basketball players in the United States
KK Igokea players
KK Partizan players
Liga ACB players
Maccabi Ashdod B.C. players
Olimpia Milano players
Olympiacos B.C. players
Point guards
Shooting guards
Undrafted National Basketball Association players
Valencia Basket players
Virtus Bologna players
21st-century African-American sportspeople
20th-century African-American people
Naturalized citizens of Croatia